Bromiini (or Adoxini) is a tribe of leaf beetles in the subfamily Eumolpinae. The tribe contains approximately 120 genera, which are found worldwide. They are generally thought to be an artificial group, often with a subcylindrical prothorax without lateral ridges and covered with setae or scales.

Nomenclature
The name "Bromiini" is conserved over the older name "Adoxini" because of Article 40(2) of the ICZN, which states: "If ... a family-group name was replaced before 1961 because of the synonymy of the type genus, the substitute name is to be maintained if it is in prevailing usage. A name maintained by virtue of this Article retains its own author but takes the priority of the replaced name, of which it is deemed to be the senior synonym." Bromiini is cited with its own author and date, followed by the date of the replaced name in parentheses: Bromiini Baly, 1865 (1863).

Taxonomy
Following the leaf beetle classification of Seeno and Wilcox (1982), the genera of Bromiini are divided into eight informal groups or "sections": Bromiites, Leprotites, Myochroites, Nerissites, Pseudocolaspites, Scelodontites, Tomyrites and Trichochryseites. In 1993, the section Tomyrites (interpreted as the subtribe "Tomyrina") was given the replacement name "Ebooina" by C.A.M. Reid, as it was based on a preoccupied genus-group name.

In the Catalog of the leaf beetles of America North of Mexico, published in 2003, Myochroites was placed in synonymy with the section Iphimeites in Eumolpini, while Scelodontites was transferred to Typophorini. Of the genera formerly placed in Myochroites, Glyptoscelis and Myochrous were transferred to Iphimeites in Eumolpini, Colaspidea was transferred to Leprotites, while the placement of the remaining genera was not determined.

Genera
These 68 genera belong to the tribe Bromiini:

 Acrothinium Marshall, 1865
 Andosia Weise, 1896
 Anidania Reitter, 1889
 Aoria Baly, 1863
 †Aoriopsis Moseyko, Kirejtshuk & Nel, 2010
 Apolepis Baly, 1863
 Aulexis Baly, 1863
 Brevicolaspis Laporte, 1833
 Bromius Chevrolat in Dejean, 1836
 Callipta Lefèvre, 1885
 Caspiana Lopatin, 1978
 Cellomius Lefèvre, 1888
 Chalcosicya Blake, 1930
 Colaspidea Laporte, 1833
 Colaspina Weise, 1893
 Cryocolaspis Flowers, 2004
 Damasus Chapuis, 1874
 Damelia Clark, 1864
 Demotina Baly, 1863
 Dermestops Jacobson, 1898
 Eboo Reid, 1993
 Eka Maulik, 1931
 Endroedymolpus Zoia, 2001
 Enneaoria Tan, 1981
 Erythraella Zoia, 2012
 Eryxia Baly, 1865
 Fidia Motschulsky, 1861 (= Lypesthes Baly, 1863)
 Goniopleura Westwood, 1832
 Hemiplatys Baly, 1863
 Heterotrichus Chapuis, 1874
 Hyperaxis Harold, 1874
 Irenes Chapuis, 1874
 Lahejia Gahan, 1896
 Lepina Baly, 1863
 Macetes Chapuis, 1874
 Macrocoma Chapuis, 1874
 Malegia Lefèvre, 1883
 Mecistes Chapuis, 1874
 Mesocolaspis Jacoby, 1908
 Neocles Chapuis, 1874
 Neocloides Jacoby, 1898
 Neofidia Strother, 2020 (= Fidia Baly, 1863)
 Osnaparis Fairmaire, 1889
 Pachnephoptrus Reitter, 1892
 Pachnephorus Chevrolat in Dejean, 1836
 Parademotina Bryant & Gressitt, 1957
 Parheminodes Chen, 1940
 Parnops Jacobson, 1894
 Phortus Weise, 1899
 Piomera Baly, 1863
 †Profidia Gressitt, 1963
 Pseudaoria Jacoby, 1908
 Pseudocolaspis Laporte, 1833
 Pseudolepis Medvedev & Zoia, 2001
 Pseudometaxis Jacoby, 1900
 Pseudoxanthus Zoia, 2010
 Rhodopaea Gruev & Tomov, 1968
 Semmiona Fairmaire, 1885
 Scelodonta Westwood, 1838 (= Heteraspis Chevrolat in Dejean, 1836)
 Stasimus Baly, 1863
 Tanybria Selman, 1963
 Thootes Jacoby, 1890
 Trichochalcea Baly, 1878
 Trichochrysea Baly, 1861
 Trichotheca Baly, 1860
 Trichoxantha Medvedev, 1992
 Xanthonia Baly, 1863
 Xanthophorus Jacoby, 1908

According to BugGuide and ITIS, the genus Graphops has been transferred to the tribe Typophorini, and Glyptoscelis and Myochrous to the tribe Eumolpini.

References

Beetle tribes
Eumolpinae